George Walker (1877–1930) was an English footballer who played for Crystal Palace as a full back.

Career
Born in Wednesbury, Walker played for Wolverhampton Wanderers, before joining the newly established club, Crystal Palace. After one season at Palace Walker moved to New Brompton for the 1906–07 season, before returning to Palace in 1907. He remained with Palace until 1909.

References

1877 births
English footballers
Wolverhampton Wanderers F.C. players
Crystal Palace F.C. players
Gillingham F.C. players
Southern Football League players
1930 deaths
Date of birth missing
Date of death missing
Sportspeople from Wednesbury
Association football fullbacks